is a Japanese former cyclist. He competed in the individual road race at the 1992 Summer Olympics. He was also Japanese national champion in 1992. During his career, he rode for Aisan Racing Team, and after retirement, served as both team manager and general manager of Aisan.

References

1971 births
Living people
Japanese male cyclists
Olympic cyclists of Japan
Cyclists at the 1992 Summer Olympics
People from Gifu